Bernd Borth (born 25 July 1948) is a German sprinter. He competed in the men's 100 metres at the 1972 Summer Olympics representing East Germany.

References

1948 births
Living people
People from Freyburg, Germany
German male sprinters
Sportspeople from Saxony-Anhalt
Olympic athletes of East Germany
Athletes (track and field) at the 1972 Summer Olympics